Henry Arthur Kean Sr. (April 20, 1894 – December 12, 1955) was an American football and basketball coach.  He served as head football coach at Kentucky State University from 1931 to 1942 and Tennessee Agricultural & Industrial State College—now known as Tennessee State University from 1944 to 1954, compiling a career college football coaching record of 165–34–9, with a winning percentage of .819.  Kean was also the head basketball coach at Tennessee A&I from 1944 to 1949 and again in 1950–51, tallying a mark of 108–26.

Coaching career

Kentucky State
Kean was the sixth head football coach at Kentucky State University in Frankfort, Kentucky, a position he held for 12 seasons, from 1931 until 1942.  During his tenure there, he led the team to two black college football national championship. His coaching record at Kentucky State was 73–17–6.

Tennessee State
Kean moved to Tennessee State University in 1943 and led the Tigers to five football national titles.  Kean was the 11th head football coach for the Tigers in Nashville, Tennessee and he held that position for 11 seasons, from 1944 until 1954.  His coaching record at Tennessee State was 93–16–3.

Henry Kean also coached basketball at Tennessee State from 1944 to 1949 and from 1950 to 1951. As head coach, he recorded a record of 108–26. In 1948–49, the Tigers went undefeated finishing with a record of 24 wins, scoring 1,765 points while allowing only 977 points by their opponents. This team remains Tennessee State's only undefeated team.

Kean was inducted into the Tennessee State Sports Hall of Fame in 1983. Kean Hall Gymnasium, nicknamed "Kean's Little Garden," is named in his honor.

Personal life
Born in Louisville, Kentucky, Kean held college degrees from both Indiana University Bloomington and Fisk University, and taught mathematics at Louisville's Central High School.  He died at the age of 61, on December 12, 1955, at a hospital in Nashville, Tennessee.

Head coaching record

Football

References

External links
 

1894 births
1955 deaths
Fisk Bulldogs football players
Kentucky State Thorobreds and Thorobrettes athletic directors
Kentucky State Thorobreds football coaches
Tennessee State Tigers and Lady Tigers athletic directors
Tennessee State Tigers basketball coaches
Tennessee State Tigers football coaches
Indiana University Bloomington alumni
Coaches of American football from Kentucky
Players of American football from Louisville, Kentucky
Basketball coaches from Kentucky
African-American coaches of American football
African-American players of American football
African-American basketball coaches
African-American college athletic directors in the United States
20th-century African-American sportspeople